Silent Strength (film), 1919 American silent film directed by Paul Scardon
Silent Strength (album), 1989 album by Shirley Jones